Klondyke Raaff (10 Mar 1879 –  13 Jul 1949) was a South African international rugby union player who played as a forward.

He made 6 appearances for South Africa from 1903 to 1910.

References

South African rugby union players
South Africa international rugby union players
1879 births
1949 deaths
Rugby union forwards
Griquas (rugby union) players